Ada Cornaro (29 June 1881 – 19 March 1961) was a prominent Argentine film and theatre actress, tango dancer and singer of the 1930s and 1940s.

Although she entered film in 1924 her claim to fame was in the 1930 tango film hit Adiós Argentina in which she starred alongside icon Libertad Lamarque.

She appeared in tango films such as Alas de mi patria (1939), Academia El Tango Argentino and Así te quiero (1942) and Apasionadamente (1944).

She retired from film in 1951 after her last film "Volver a la vida".  She died in Buenos Aires.

Filmography
Volver à la vida (1951)
De padre desconocido (1949)
Cuna vacía, La (1949)
María de los Ángeles (1948) .... Criolla
Tambor de Tacuarí, El (1948)
24 horas en la vida de una mujer (1944)
 Apasionadamente (1944)
Son cartas de amor (1943)
Valle negro (1943)
 Así te quiero (1942)
 Academia El Tango Argentino (1942)
Professor Cero, El (1942)
Sendas cruzadas (1942)
Mujer del zapatero, La (1941)
 Boína blanca (1941)
Hermano José, El (1941)
Huella (1940)
Ojazos de mi negra, Los (1940)
Pueblo chico, infierno grande (1940)
Matrero, El (1939)
 Alas de mi patria (1939)
Callejón sin salida (1938/I)
Viento norte (1937)
Mateo (1937)
The Song of the Riverside (1936)
Mi Buenos Aires querido (1936)
 Adiós Argentina (1930)
 El Consultorio de Madame René (1924)

External links
 

Argentine film actresses
People from Buenos Aires
Tango film actresses
1881 births
1961 deaths